The NO&M Subdivision is a railroad line owned by CSX Transportation in the U.S. states of Alabama, Mississippi, and Louisiana. At its east end it continues west from the M&M Subdivision and at its west end it continues west as the CSX Transportation.

See also
 List of CSX Transportation lines

References

CSX Transportation lines
Rail infrastructure in Alabama